This is a list of computer scientists, people who do work in computer science, in particular researchers and authors.

Some persons notable as programmers are included here because they work in research as well as program. A few of these people pre-date the invention of the digital computer; they are now regarded as computer scientists because their work can be seen as leading to the invention of the computer. Others are mathematicians whose work falls within what would now be called theoretical computer science, such as complexity theory and algorithmic information theory.

A

 Atta ur Rehman Khan – Mobile Cloud Computing, Cybersecurity, IoT
 Wil van der Aalst – business process management, process mining, Petri nets
 Scott Aaronson – quantum computing and complexity theory
 Rediet Abebe – algorithms, artificial intelligence
 Hal Abelson – intersection of computing and teaching
 Serge Abiteboul – database theory
 Samson Abramsky – game semantics
 Leonard Adleman – RSA, DNA computing
 Manindra Agrawal – polynomial-time primality testing
 Luis von Ahn – human-based computation
 Alfred Aho – compilers book, the 'a' in AWK
 Frances E. Allen – compiler optimization
 Gene Amdahl – supercomputer developer, Amdahl Corporation founder
 David P. Anderson – volunteer computing
 Lisa Anthony – natural user interfaces
 Andrew Appel – compiler of text books
 Cecilia R. Aragon – invented treap, human-centered data science
 Bruce Arden – programming language compilers (GAT, Michigan Algorithm Decoder (MAD)), virtual memory architecture, Michigan Terminal System (MTS)
 Sanjeev Arora – PCP theorem
 Winifred "Tim" Alice Asprey – established the computer science curriculum at Vassar College
 John Vincent Atanasoff – computer pioneer, creator of Atanasoff Berry Computer (ABC)
 Shakuntala Atre – database theory

B

 Charles Babbage (1791–1871) – invented first mechanical computer called the supreme mathematician
 Charles Bachman – American computer scientist, known for Integrated Data Store
 Roland Carl Backhouse – mathematics of computer program construction, algorithmic problem solving, ALGOL
 John Backus – FORTRAN, Backus–Naur form, first complete compiler
 David F. Bacon – programming languages, garbage collection
 David A. Bader
 Victor Bahl
 Anthony James Barr – SAS System
 Jean Bartik (1924–2011) – one of the first computer programmers, on ENIAC (1946), one of the first Vacuum tube computers, back when "programming" involved using cables, dials, and switches to physically rewire the machine; worked with John Mauchly toward BINAC (1949), EDVAC (1949), UNIVAC (1951) to develop early "stored program" computers
 Andrew Barto
 Friedrich L. Bauer – Stack (data structure), Sequential Formula Translation, ALGOL, software engineering, Bauer–Fike theorem
 Rudolf Bayer – B-tree
 Gordon Bell (born 1934) – computer designer DEC VAX, author: Computer Structures
 Steven M. Bellovin – network security
 Cecilia Berdichevsky (1925–2010) pioneering Argentinian computer scientist
 Tim Berners-Lee – World Wide Web
 Daniel J. Bernstein – qmail, software as protected speech
 Peter Bernus
 Abhay Bhushan
 Dines Bjørner – Vienna Development Method (VDM), RAISE
 Gerrit Blaauw – one of the principal designers of the IBM System 360 line of computers
 Sue Black
 David Blei
 Dorothy Blum – National Security Agency
 Lenore Blum – complexity
 Manuel Blum – cryptography
 Barry Boehm – software engineering economics, spiral development
 Corrado Böhm – author of the structured program theorem
 Kurt Bollacker
 Jeff Bonwick – invented slab allocation and ZFS
 Grady Booch – Unified Modeling Language, Object Management Group
 George Boole – Boolean logic
 Andrew Booth – developed the first rotating drum storage device
 Kathleen Booth – developed the first assembly language
 Anita Borg (1949–2003) – American computer scientist, founder of Anita Borg Institute for Women and Technology
 Bert Bos – Cascading Style Sheets
 Mikhail Botvinnik – World Chess Champion, computer scientist and electrical engineer, pioneered early expert system AI and computer chess
 Jonathan Bowen – Z notation, formal methods
 Stephen R. Bourne – Bourne shell, portable ALGOL 68C compiler
 Harry Bouwman (born 1953) – Dutch Information systems researcher, and Professor at the Åbo Akademi University
 Robert S. Boyer – string searching, ACL2 theorem prover
 Karlheinz Brandenburg – Main mp3 contributor
 Lawrence M. Breed – implementation of Iverson Notation (APL), co-developed APL\360, Scientific Time Sharing Corporation cofounder
 Jack E. Bresenham – early computer-graphics contributions, including Bresenham's algorithm
 Sergey Brin – co-founder of Google
 David J. Brown – unified memory architecture, binary compatibility
 Per Brinch Hansen (surname "Brinch Hansen") – RC 4000 multiprogramming system, operating system kernels, microkernels, monitors, concurrent programming, Concurrent Pascal, distributed computing & processes, parallel computing
 Sjaak Brinkkemper – methodology of product software development
 Fred Brooks – System 360, OS/360, The Mythical Man-Month, No Silver Bullet
 Rod Brooks
 Margaret Burnett – visual programming languages, end-user software engineering, and gender-inclusive software
 Michael Butler – Event-B

C
 Pino Caballero Gil – cryptography
 Tracy Camp – wireless computing
 Martin Campbell-Kelly – history of computing
 Rosemary Candlin
 Rod Canion - cofounder of Compaq Computer Corporation
 Bryan Cantrill – invented DTrace
 Luca Cardelli – 
 John Carmack – codeveloped Doom
 Edwin Catmull – computer graphics
 Vint Cerf – Internet, TCP/IP
 Gregory Chaitin
 Robert Cailliau – Belgian computer scientist
 Zhou Chaochen – duration calculus
 Peter Chen – entity-relationship model, data modeling, conceptual model
 Leonardo Chiariglione – founder of MPEG
 Tracy Chou – computer scientist and activist
 Alonzo Church – mathematics of combinators, lambda calculus
 Alberto Ciaramella – speech recognition, patent informatics
 Edmund M. Clarke – model checking
 John Cocke – RISC
 Edgar F. Codd (1923–2003) – formulated the database relational model
 Jacques Cohen – computer science professor
 Ian Coldwater – computer security
 Simon Colton – computational creativity
 Alain Colmerauer – Prolog
 Douglas Comer – Xinu
 Paul Justin Compton – Ripple Down Rules
 Richard W. Conway – CORC, CUPL, and PL/C languages and dialects; programming textbooks
 Gordon Cormack – co-invented dynamic Markov compression
 Stephen Cook – NP-completeness
 James Cooley – Fast Fourier transform (FFT)
 Danese Cooper – open-source software
 Fernando J. Corbató – Compatible Time-Sharing System (CTSS), Multics
 Kit Cosper – open-source software
 Patrick Cousot – abstract interpretation
 Ingemar Cox – digital watermarking
 Seymour Cray – Cray Research, supercomputer
 Nello Cristianini – machine learning, pattern analysis, artificial intelligence
 Jon Crowcroft – networking
 W. Bruce Croft
 Glen Culler – interactive computing, computer graphics, high performance computing
 Haskell Curry

D
 Luigi Dadda – designer of the Dadda multiplier
 Ole-Johan Dahl – Simula, object-oriented programming
 Ryan Dahl – founder of node.js project
 Andries van Dam – computer graphics, hypertext
 Samir Das – Wireless Networks, Mobile Computing, Vehicular ad hoc network, Sensor Networks, Mesh networking, Wireless ad hoc network
 Neil Daswani – computer security, co-founder and co-director of Stanford Advanced Computer Security Program, co-founder of Dasient (acquired by Twitter), former chief information security of LifeLock and Symantec's Consumer Business Unit
 Christopher J. Date – proponent of database relational model
 Jeff Dean – Bigtable, MapReduce, Spanner of Google
 Erik Demaine – computational origami
 Tom DeMarco
 Richard DeMillo – computer security, software engineering, educational technology
 Dorothy E. Denning – computer security
 Peter J. Denning – identified the use of an operating system's working set and balance set, President of ACM
 Michael Dertouzos – Director of Massachusetts Institute of Technology (MIT) Laboratory for Computer Science (LCS) from 1974 to 2001
 Alexander Dewdney
 Robert Dewar – IFIP WG 2.1 member, ALGOL 68, chairperson; AdaCore cofounder, president, CEO
 Vinod Dham – P5 Pentium processor
 Jan Dietz (born 1945) (decay constant) – information systems theory and Design & Engineering Methodology for Organizations
 Whitfield Diffie (born 1944) (linear response function) – public key cryptography, Diffie–Hellman key exchange
 Edsger Dijkstra – algorithms, Dijkstra's algorithm, Go To Statement Considered Harmful, semaphore (programming), IFIP WG 2.1 member
 Matthew Dillon – DragonFly BSD with LWKT, vkernel OS-level virtualisation, file systems: HAMMER1, HAMMER2
 Alan Dix – wrote important university level textbook on human–computer interaction
 Jack Dongarra – linear algebra high performance computing (HCI)
 Marco Dorigo – ant colony optimization
 Paul Dourish – human computer interaction
 Charles Stark Draper (1901–1987) – designer of Apollo Guidance Computer, "father of inertial navigation", MIT professor
 Susan Dumais – information retrieval
 Adam Dunkels – Contiki, lwIP, uIP, protothreads
 Jon Michael Dunn – founding dean of Indiana University School of Informatics, information based logics especially relevance logic
 Schahram Dustdar – Distributed Systems, TU Wien, Austria

E
 Peter Eades – graph drawing
 Annie Easley
 Wim Ebbinkhuijsen – COBOL
 John Presper Eckert – ENIAC
 Alan Edelman – Edelman's Law, stochastic operator, Interactive Supercomputing, Julia (programming language) cocreator, high performance computing, numerical computing
 Brendan Eich – JavaScript, Mozilla
 Philip Emeagwali – supercomputing
 E. Allen Emerson – model checking
 Douglas Engelbart – tiled windows, hypertext, computer mouse
 Barbara Engelhardt – latent variable models, genomics, quantitative trait locus (QTL)
 David Eppstein 
 Andrey Ershov – languages ALPHA, Rapira; first Soviet time-sharing system AIST-0, electronic publishing system RUBIN, multiprocessing workstation MRAMOR, IFIP WG 2.1 member, Aesthetics and the Human Factor in Programming
 Don Estridge (1937–1985) – led development of original IBM Personal Computer (PC); known as "father of the IBM PC"
 Oren Etzioni – MetaCrawler, Netbot
 Christopher Riche Evans
 David C. Evans – computer graphics
 Shimon Even

F
 Scott Fahlman
 Edward Feigenbaum – intelligence
 Edward Felten – computer security
 Tim Finin
 Raphael Finkel
 Donald Firesmith
 Gary William Flake
 Tommy Flowers – Colossus computer
 Robert Floyd – NP-completeness
 Sally Floyd – Internet congestion control
 Lawrence J. Fogel – evolutionary programming
 James D. Foley
 Ken Forbus
 L. R. Ford, Jr.
 Lance Fortnow
 Mahmoud Samir Fayed – PWCT, Ring
 Martin Fowler
 Robert France
 Herbert W. Franke
 Edward Fredkin
 Yoav Freund
 Daniel P. Friedman
 Charlotte Froese Fischer – computational theoretical physics
 Ping Fu
 Xiaoming Fu
 Kunihiko Fukushima – neocognitron, artificial neural networks, convolutional neural network architecture, unsupervised learning, deep learning
 D. R. Fulkerson

G
 Richard P. Gabriel – Maclisp, Common Lisp, Worse is Better, League for Programming Freedom, Lucid Inc., XEmacs
 Zvi Galil
 Bernard Galler – MAD (programming language)
 Hector Garcia-Molina
 Michael Garey – NP-completeness
 Hugo de Garis
 Bill Gates – cofounder of Microsoft
 David Gelernter
 Lisa Gelobter – was the Chief Digital Service Officer for the U.S. Department of Education, founder of teQuitable
 Charles Geschke
 Zoubin Ghahramani
 Sanjay Ghemawat
 Jeremy Gibbons – generic programming, functional programming, formal methods, computational biology, bioinformatics
 Juan E. Gilbert – human-centered computing
 Lee Giles – CiteSeer
 Seymour Ginsburg – formal languages, automata theory, AFL theory, database theory
 Robert L. Glass
 Kurt Gödel – computability; not a computer scientist per se, but his work was invaluable in the field
 Ashok Goel
 Joseph Goguen
 Hardik Gohel
 E. Mark Gold – Language identification in the limit
 Adele Goldberg – Smalltalk
 Andrew V. Goldberg – algorithms, algorithm engineering
 Ian Goldberg – cryptographer, off-the-record messaging
 Judy Goldsmith - computational complexity theory, decision theory, and computer ethics
 Oded Goldreich – cryptography, computational complexity theory
 Shafi Goldwasser – cryptography, computational complexity theory
 Gene Golub – Matrix computation
 Martin Charles Golumbic – algorithmic graph theory
 Gastón Gonnet – cofounder of Waterloo Maple Inc.
 Ian Goodfellow – machine learning 
 James Gosling – Network extensible Window System (NeWS), Java
 Paul Graham – Viaweb, On Lisp, Arc
 Robert M. Graham – programming language compilers (GAT, Michigan Algorithm Decoder (MAD)), virtual memory architecture, Multics
 Susan L. Graham – compilers, programming environments
 Jim Gray – database
 Sheila Greibach – Greibach normal form, Abstract family of languages (AFL) theory
 David Gries – The Science of Programming, Interference freedom, Member Emeritus, IFIP WG 2.3 on Programming Methodology
 Ralph Griswold – SNOBOL
 Bill Gropp – Message Passing Interface, Portable, Extensible Toolkit for Scientific Computation (PETSc)
 Tom Gruber – ontology engineering
 Shelia Guberman – handwriting recognition
 Ramanathan V. Guha – Resource Description Framework (RDF), Netscape, RSS, Epinions
 Neil J. Gunther – computer performance analysis, capacity planning
 Jürg Gutknecht – with Niklaus Wirth: Lilith computer; Modula-2, Oberon, Zonnon programming languages; Oberon operating system
 Michael Guy – Phoenix, work on number theory, computer algebra, higher dimension polyhedra theory; with John Horton Conway
 Robert Griesemer – Go language

H
 Nico Habermann – work on operating systems, software engineering, inter-process communication, process synchronization, deadlock avoidance, software verification, programming languages: ALGOL 60, BLISS, Pascal, Ada
 Philipp Matthäus Hahn – mechanical calculator
 Eldon C. Hall – Apollo Guidance Computer
 Wendy Hall
 Joseph Halpern
 Margaret Hamilton – ultra-reliable software design
 Richard Hamming – Hamming code, founder of the Association for Computing Machinery
 Jiawei Han – data mining
 Frank Harary – graph theory
 Juris Hartmanis – computational complexity theory
 Johan Håstad – computational complexity theory
 Les Hatton – software failure and vulnerabilities
 Igor Hawryszkiewycz, (born 1948) – American computer scientist and organizational theorist
 He Jifeng – provably correct systems
 Eric Hehner – predicative programming, formal methods, quote notation, ALGOL
 Martin Hellman – encryption
 Gernot Heiser – operating system teaching, research, commercialising, Open Kernel Labs, OKL4, Wombat
 James Hendler – Semantic Web
 John L. Hennessy – computer architecture
 Andrew Herbert
 Carl Hewitt
 Kelsey Hightower – open source, cloud computing
 Danny Hillis – Connection Machine
 Geoffrey Hinton
 Julia Hirschberg
 Tin Kam Ho – artificial intelligence, machine learning
 C. A. R. Hoare – logic, rigor, communicating sequential processes (CSP)
 Louis Hodes (1934–2008) – Lisp, pattern recognition, logic programming, cancer research
 Betty Holberton – ENIAC programmer, developed the first Sort Merge Generator
 John Henry Holland – genetic algorithms
 Herman Hollerith (1860–1929) – invented recording of data on a machine readable medium, using punched cards
 Gerard Holzmann – software verification, logic model checking (SPIN)
 John Hopcroft – compilers
 Admiral Grace Hopper (1906–1992) – developed early compilers: FLOW-Matic, COBOL; worked on UNIVAC; gave speeches on computer history, where she gave out nano-seconds
 Eric Horvitz – artificial intelligence
 Alston Householder
 Paul Hudak (1952–2015) – Haskell language design
 David A. Huffman (1925–1999) – Huffman coding, used in data compression
 John Hughes – structuring computations with arrows; QuickCheck randomized program testing framework; Haskell language design
 Roger Hui – co-created J language
 Watts Humphrey (1927–2010) – Personal Software Process (PSP), Software quality, Team Software Process (TSP)

I
 Jean Ichbiah – Ada
 Roberto Ierusalimschy – Lua (programming language)
 Dan Ingalls – Smalltalk, BitBlt, Lively Kernel
 Mary Jane Irwin
 Kenneth E. Iverson – APL, J

J
 Ivar Jacobson – Unified Modeling Language, Object Management Group
 Anil K. Jain (born 1948)
 Ramesh Jain
 Jonathan James
 David S. Johnson
 Stephen C. Johnson
 Cliff Jones – Vienna Development Method (VDM)
 Michael I. Jordan
 Mathai Joseph
 Aravind K. Joshi
 Bill Joy (born 1954) – Sun Microsystems, BSD UNIX, vi, csh
 Dan Jurafsky – natural language processing

K
 William Kahan – numerical analysis
 Robert E. Kahn – TCP/IP
 Avinash Kak – digital image processing
 Poul-Henning Kamp – invented GBDE, FreeBSD Jails, Varnish cache
 David Karger
 Richard Karp – NP-completeness
 Narendra Karmarkar – Karmarkar's algorithm
 Marek Karpinski – NP optimization problems
 Ted Kaehler – Smalltalk, Squeak, HyperCard
 Alan Kay – Dynabook, Smalltalk, overlapping windows
 Neeraj Kayal – AKS primality test
 Manolis Kellis – computational biology
 John George Kemeny – the language BASIC
 Ken Kennedy – compiling for parallel and vector machines
 Brian Kernighan (born 1942) – Unix, the 'k' in AWK
 Carl Kesselman – grid computing
 Gregor Kiczales – CLOS, reflection, aspect-oriented programming
 Peter T. Kirstein – Internet
 Stephen Cole Kleene – Kleene closure, recursion theory
 Dan Klein – Natural language processing, Machine translation
 Leonard Kleinrock – ARPANET, queueing theory, packet switching, hierarchical routing
 Donald Knuth – The Art of Computer Programming, MIX/MMIX, TeX, literate programming
 Andrew Koenig – C++
 Daphne Koller – Artificial intelligence, bayesian network
 Michael Kölling – BlueJ
 Andrey Nikolaevich Kolmogorov – algorithmic complexity theory
 Janet L. Kolodner – case-based reasoning
 David Korn – KornShell
 Kees Koster – ALGOL 68
 Robert Kowalski – logic programming
 John Koza – genetic programming
 John Krogstie – SEQUAL framework
 Joseph Kruskal – Kruskal's algorithm
 Maarja Kruusmaa – underwater roboticist
 Thomas E. Kurtz (born 1928) – BASIC programming language; Dartmouth College computer professor

L
 Richard E. Ladner
 Monica S. Lam
 Leslie Lamport – algorithms for distributed computing, LaTeX
 Butler Lampson – SDS 940, founding member Xerox PARC, Xerox Alto, Turing Award
 Peter Landin – ISWIM, J operator, SECD machine, off-side rule, syntactic sugar, ALGOL, IFIP WG 2.1 member, advanced lambda calculus to model programming languages (aided functional programming), denotational semantics
 Tom Lane – Independent JPEG Group, PostgreSQL, Portable Network Graphics (PNG)
 Börje Langefors
 Chris Lattner – creator of Swift (programming language) and LLVM compiler infrastructure
 Steve Lawrence
 Edward D. Lazowska
 Joshua Lederberg
 Manny M Lehman
 Charles E. Leiserson – cache-oblivious algorithms, provably good work-stealing, coauthor of Introduction to Algorithms
 Douglas Lenat – artificial intelligence, Cyc
 Yann LeCun
 Rasmus Lerdorf – PHP
 Max Levchin – Gausebeck–Levchin test and PayPal
 Leonid Levin – computational complexity theory
 Kevin Leyton-Brown – artificial intelligence
 J.C.R. Licklider
 David Liddle
 Jochen Liedtke – microkernel operating systems Eumel, L3, L4
 John Lions – Lions' Commentary on UNIX 6th Edition, with Source Code (Lions Book)
 Charles H. Lindsey – IFIP WG 2.1 member, Revised Report on ALGOL 68
 Richard J. Lipton – computational complexity theory
 Barbara Liskov – programming languages
 Yanhong Annie Liu – programming languages, algorithms, program design, program optimization, software systems, optimizing, analysis, and transformations, intelligent systems, distributed computing, computer security, IFIP WG 2.1 member
 Darrell Long – computer data storage, computer security
 Patricia D. Lopez – broadening participation in computing
 Gillian Lovegrove
 Ada Lovelace – first programmer
 David Luckham – Lisp, Automated theorem proving, Stanford Pascal Verifier, Complex event processing, Rational Software cofounder (Ada compiler)
 Eugene Luks
 Nancy Lynch

M
 Nadia Magnenat Thalmann – computer graphics, virtual actor
 Tom Maibaum
 Zohar Manna – fuzzy logic
 James Martin – information engineering
 Robert C. Martin (Uncle Bob) – software craftsmanship
 John Mashey
 Yuri Matiyasevich – solving Hilbert's tenth problem
 Yukihiro Matsumoto – Ruby (programming language)
 John Mauchly (1907–1980) – designed ENIAC, first general-purpose electronic digital computer, as well as EDVAC, BINAC and UNIVAC I, the first commercial computer; worked with Jean Bartik on ENIAC and Grace Murray Hopper on UNIVAC
 Ujjwal Maulik (1965–) Multi-objective Clustering and Bioinformatics
 Derek McAuley – ubiquitous computing, computer architecture, networking
 John McCarthy – Lisp (programming language), ALGOL, IFIP WG 2.1 member, artificial intelligence
 Andrew McCallum
 Douglas McIlroy – macros, pipes, Unix philosophy
 Chris McKinstry – artificial intelligence, Mindpixel
 Marshall Kirk McKusick – BSD, Berkeley Fast File System
 Lambert Meertens – ALGOL 68, IFIP WG 2.1 member, ABC (programming language)
 Kurt Mehlhorn – algorithms, data structures, LEDA
 Dora Metcalf – entrepreneur, engineer and mathematician
 Bertrand Meyer – Eiffel (programming language)
 Silvio Micali – cryptography
 Robin Milner – ML (programming language)
 Jack Minker – database logic
 Marvin Minsky – artificial intelligence, perceptrons, Society of Mind
 James G. Mitchell – WATFOR compiler, Mesa (programming language), Spring (operating system), ARM architecture
 Tom M. Mitchell
 Arvind Mithal – formal verification of large digital systems, developing dynamic dataflow architectures, parallel computing programming languages (Id, pH), compiling on parallel machines
 Paul Mockapetris – Domain Name System (DNS)
 Cleve Moler – numerical analysis, MATLAB
 Faron Moller – concurrency theory
 John P. Moon – inventor, Apple Inc.
 Charles H. Moore – Forth language
 Edward F. Moore – Moore machine
 Gordon Moore – Moore's law
 J Strother Moore – string searching, ACL2 theorem prover
 Roger Moore – co-developed APL\360, created IPSANET, co-founded I. P. Sharp Associates
 Hans Moravec – robotics
 Carroll Morgan – formal methods
 Robert Tappan Morris – Morris worm
 Joel Moses – Macsyma
 Rajeev Motwani – randomized algorithm
 Oleg A. Mukhanov – quantum computing developer, co-founder and CTO of SeeQC
 Stephen Muggleton – Inductive Logic Programming
 Klaus-Robert Müller – machine learning, artificial intelligence
 Alan Mycroft – programming languages
 Brad A. Myers – human-computer interaction
 M.M. Musharaf Hussain – Parallel Computing and Multicore Superscalar Processor

N
 Mihai Nadin – anticipation research
 Makoto Nagao – machine translation, natural language processing, digital library
 Frieder Nake – pioneered computer arts
 Bonnie Nardi – human–computer interaction
 Peter Naur (1928–2016) – Backus–Naur form (BNF), ALGOL 60, IFIP WG 2.1 member
 Roger Needham – computer security
 James G. Nell – Generalised Enterprise Reference Architecture and Methodology (GERAM)
 Greg Nelson (1953–2015) – satisfiability modulo theories, extended static checking, program verification, Modula-3 committee, Simplify theorem prover in ESC/Java
 Bernard de Neumann – massively parallel autonomous cellular processor, software engineering research
 Klara Dan von Neumann (1911–1963) – early computers, ENIAC programmer and control designer
 John von Neumann (1903–1957) – early computers, von Neumann machine, set theory, functional analysis, mathematics pioneer, linear programming, quantum mechanics
 Allen Newell – artificial intelligence, Computer Structures
 Max Newman – Colossus computer, MADM
 Andrew Ng – artificial intelligence, machine learning, robotics
 Nils John Nilsson (1933–2019) – artificial intelligence
 G.M. Nijssen – Nijssen's Information Analysis Methodology (NIAM) object-role modeling
 Tobias Nipkow – proof assistance
 Maurice Nivat – theoretical computer science, Theoretical Computer Science journal, ALGOL, IFIP WG 2.1 member
 Phiwa Nkambule – Fintech, artificial intelligence, machine learning, robotics
 Jerre Noe – computerized banking
 Peter Nordin – artificial intelligence, genetic programming, evolutionary robotics
 Donald Norman – user interfaces, usability
 Peter Norvig – artificial intelligence, Director of Research at Google
 George Novacky – University of Pittsburgh: assistant department chair, senior lecturer in computer science, assistant dean of CAS for undergraduate studies
 Kristen Nygaard – Simula, object-oriented programming

O
 Martin Odersky – Scala programming language
 Peter O'Hearn – separation logic, bunched logic, Infer Static Analyzer
 T. William Olle – Ferranti Mercury
 Steve Omohundro
 Severo Ornstein
 John O'Sullivan – Wi-Fi
 John Ousterhout – Tcl programming language
 Mark Overmars – video game programming
 Susan Owicki – interference freedom

P
 Larry Page – co-founder of Google
 Sankar Pal
 Paritosh Pandya
 Christos Papadimitriou
 David Park (1935–1990) – first Lisp implementation, expert in fairness, program schemas, bisimulation in concurrent computing
 David Parnas – information hiding, modular programming
 DJ Patil – former Chief Data Scientist of United States
 Yale Patt – Instruction-level parallelism, speculative architectures
 David Patterson – reduced instruction set computer (RISC), RISC-V, redundant arrays of inexpensive disks (RAID), Berkeley Network of Workstations (NOW)
 Mike Paterson – algorithms, analysis of algorithms (complexity)
 Mihai Pătraşcu – data structures
 Lawrence Paulson – ML
 Randy Pausch (1960–2008) – human–computer interaction, Carnegie professor, "Last Lecture"
 Juan Pavón – software agents
 Judea Pearl – artificial intelligence, search algorithms
 Alan Perlis – Programming Pearls
 Radia Perlman – spanning tree protocol
 Pier Giorgio Perotto – computer designer at Olivetti, designer of the Programma 101 programmable calculator 
 Rózsa Péter – recursive function theory
 Simon Peyton Jones – functional programming
 Kathy Pham – data, artificial intelligence, civic technology, healthcare, ethics
 Roberto Pieraccini – speech technologist, engineering director at Google
 Gordon Plotkin
 Amir Pnueli – temporal logic
 Willem van der Poel – computer graphics, robotics, geographic information systems, imaging, multimedia, virtual environments, games
 Cicely Popplewell (1920–1995) – British software engineer in 1960s
 Emil Post – mathematics
 Jon Postel – Internet
 Franco Preparata – computer engineering, computational geometry, parallel algorithms, computational biology
 William H. Press – numerical algorithms

R
 Rapelang Rabana
 Grzegorz Rozenberg – natural computing, automata theory, graph transformations and concurrent systems
 Michael O. Rabin – nondeterministic machine
 Dragomir R. Radev – natural language processing, information retrieval
 T. V. Raman – accessibility, Emacspeak
 Brian Randell – ALGOL 60, software fault tolerance, dependability, pre-1950 history of computing hardware
 Anders P. Ravn – Duration Calculus
 Raj Reddy – artificial intelligence
 David P. Reed
 Trygve Reenskaug – model–view–controller (MVC) software architecture pattern
 John C. Reynolds – continuations, definitional interpreters, defunctionalization, Forsythe, Gedanken language, intersection types, polymorphic lambda calculus, relational parametricity, separation logic, ALGOL
 Joyce K. Reynolds – Internet
 Reinder van de Riet – Editor: Europe of Data and Knowledge Engineering, COLOR-X event modeling language
 Bernard Richards – medical informatics
 Martin Richards – BCPL
 Adam Riese
 C. J. van Rijsbergen
 Dennis Ritchie – C (programming language), Unix
 Ron Rivest – RSA, MD5, RC4
 Ken Robinson – formal methods
 Colette Rolland – REMORA methodology, meta modelling
 John Romero – codeveloped Doom
 Azriel Rosenfeld
 Douglas T. Ross – Automatically Programmed Tools (APT), Computer-aided design, structured analysis and design technique, ALGOL X
 Guido van Rossum – Python (programming language)
 M. A. Rothman – UEFI
 Winston W. Royce – waterfall model
 Rudy Rucker – mathematician, writer, educator
 Steven Rudich – complexity theory, cryptography
 Jeff Rulifson
 James Rumbaugh – Unified Modeling Language, Object Management Group
 Peter Ružička – Slovak computer scientist and mathematician

S
 George Sadowsky
 Umar Saif
 Gerard Salton – information retrieval
 Jean E. Sammet – programming languages
 Claude Sammut – artificial intelligence researcher
 Carl Sassenrath – operating systems, programming languages, Amiga, REBOL
 Mahadev Satyanarayanan – file systems, distributed systems, mobile computing, pervasive computing
 Walter Savitch – discovery of complexity class NL, Savitch's theorem, natural language processing, mathematical linguistics
 Jonathan Schaeffer
 Wilhelm Schickard – one of the first calculating machines
 Jürgen Schmidhuber – artificial intelligence, deep learning, artificial neural networks, recurrent neural networks, Gödel machine, artificial curiosity, meta-learning
 Steve Schneider – formal methods, security
 Bruce Schneier – cryptography, security
 Fred B. Schneider – concurrent and distributed computing
 Sarita Schoenebeck — human–computer interaction
 Glenda Schroeder – command-line shell, e-mail
 Bernhard Schölkopf – machine learning, artificial intelligence
 Dana Scott – domain theory
 Michael L. Scott – programming languages, algorithms, distributed computing
 Robert Sedgewick – algorithms, data structures
 Ravi Sethi – compilers, 2nd Dragon Book
 Nigel Shadbolt
 Adi Shamir – RSA, cryptanalysis
 Claude Shannon – information theory
 David E. Shaw – computational finance, computational biochemistry, parallel architectures
 Cliff Shaw – systems programmer, artificial intelligence
 Scott Shenker – networking
 Shashi Shekhar - Spatial Computing
 Ben Shneiderman – human–computer interaction, information visualization
 Edward H. Shortliffe – MYCIN (medical diagnostic expert system)
 Daniel Siewiorek – electronic design automation, reliability computing, context aware mobile computing, wearable computing, computer-aided design, rapid prototyping, fault tolerance
 Joseph Sifakis – model checking
 Herbert A. Simon – artificial intelligence
 Munindar P. Singh – multiagent systems, software engineering, artificial intelligence, social networks
 Ramesh Sitaraman – helped build Akamai's high performance network
 Daniel Sleator – splay tree, amortized analysis
 Aaron Sloman – artificial intelligence and cognitive science
 Arne Sølvberg – information modelling
 Brian Cantwell Smith – reflection (computer science), 3lisp
 David Canfield Smith – invented interface icons, programming by demonstration, developed graphical user interface, Xerox Star; Xerox PARC researcher, cofounded Dest Systems, Cognition
 Steven Spewak – enterprise architecture planning
 Carol Spradling
 Robert Sproull
 Rohini Kesavan Srihari – information retrieval, text analytics, multilingual text mining
 Sargur Srihari – pattern recognition, machine learning, computational criminology, CEDAR-FOX
 Maciej Stachowiak – GNOME, Safari, WebKit
 Richard Stallman (born 1953) – GNU Project
 Ronald Stamper
 Richard E. Stearns – computational complexity theory
 Guy L. Steele, Jr. – Scheme, Common Lisp
 Thomas Sterling – creator of Beowulf clusters
 Alexander Stepanov – generic programming
 W. Richard Stevens (1951–1999) – author of books, including TCP/IP Illustrated and Advanced Programming in the Unix Environment
 Larry Stockmeyer – computational complexity, distributed computing
 Salvatore Stolfo – computer security, machine learning
 Michael Stonebraker – relational database practice and theory
 Olaf Storaasli – finite element machine, linear algebra, high performance computing
 Christopher Strachey – denotational semantics
 Volker Strassen – matrix multiplication, integer multiplication, Solovay–Strassen primality test
 Bjarne Stroustrup – C++
 Madhu Sudan – computational complexity theory, coding theory
 Gerald Jay Sussman – Scheme
 Bert Sutherland – graphics, Internet
 Ivan Sutherland – graphics
 Latanya Sweeney – Data privacy and algorithmic fairness
 Mario Szegedy – complexity theory, quantum computing

T
 Parisa Tabriz – Google Director of Engineering, also known as the Security Princess
 Roberto Tamassia – computational geometry, computer security
 Andrew S. Tanenbaum – operating systems, MINIX
 Austin Tate – Artificial Intelligence Applications, AI Planning, Virtual Worlds
 Bernhard Thalheim – conceptual modelling foundation
 Éva Tardos
 Gábor Tardos
 Robert Tarjan – splay tree
 Valerie Taylor
 Mario Tchou – Italian engineer, of Chinese descent, leader of Olivetti Elea project
 Jaime Teevan
 Shang-Hua Teng – analysis of algorithms
 Larry Tesler – human–computer interaction, graphical user interface, Apple Macintosh
 Avie Tevanian – Mach kernel team, NeXT, Mac OS X
 Charles P. Thacker – Xerox Alto, Microsoft Research
 Daniel Thalmann – computer graphics, virtual actor
 Ken Thompson – Unix
 Sebastian Thrun – AI researcher, pioneered autonomous driving
 Walter F. Tichy – RCS
 Seinosuke Toda – computation complexity, recipient of 1998 Gödel Prize
 Linus Torvalds – Linux kernel, Git
 Leonardo Torres y Quevedo (1852–1936) – invented El Ajedrecista (the chess player) in 1912,  a true automaton built to play chess without human guidance. In his work Essays on Automatics (1913), introduced the idea of floating-point arithmetic. In 1920, built an early electromechanical device of the Analytical Engine.
 Godfried Toussaint – computational geometry, computational music theory
 Gloria Townsend
 Edwin E. Tozer – business information systems 
 Joseph F Traub – computational complexity of scientific problems
 John V. Tucker – computability theory
 John Tukey – founder of FFT algorithm, box plot, exploratory data analysis and Coining the term 'bit'
 Alan Turing (1912–1954) – British computing pioneer, Turing machine, algorithms, cryptology, computer architecture
 David Turner – SASL, Kent Recursive Calculator, Miranda, IFIP WG 2.1 member
 Murray Turoff – computer-mediated communication

U
 Jeffrey D. Ullman – compilers, databases, complexity theory

V
 Leslie Valiant – computational complexity theory, computational learning theory
 Vladimir Vapnik – pattern recognition, computational learning theory
 Moshe Vardi – professor of computer science at Rice University
 Dorothy Vaughan
 Umesh Vazirani
 Manuela M. Veloso
 François Vernadat – enterprise modeling
 Richard Veryard – enterprise modeling
 Sergiy Vilkomir – software testing, RC/DC
 Paul Vitanyi – Kolmogorov complexity, Information distance, Normalized compression distance, Normalized Google distance
 Andrew Viterbi – Viterbi algorithm
 Jeffrey Scott Vitter – external memory algorithms, compressed data structures, data compression, databases
 Paul Vixie – DNS, BIND, PAIX, Internet Software Consortium, MAPS, DNSBL

W
 Eiiti Wada – ALGOL N, IFIP WG 2.1 member, Japanese Industrial Standards (JIS) X 0208, 0212, Happy Hacking Keyboard
 David Wagner – security, cryptography
 David Waltz
 James Z. Wang
 Steve Ward
 Manfred K. Warmuth – computational learning theory
 David H. D. Warren – AI, logic programming, Prolog, Warren Abstract Machine (WAM)
 Kevin Warwick – artificial intelligence
 Jan Weglarz
 Philip Wadler – functional programming, Haskell, Monad, Java, Logic
 Peter Wegner – object-oriented programming, interaction (computer science)
 Joseph Henry Wegstein – ALGOL 58, ALGOL 60, IFIP WG 2.1 member, data processing technical standards, fingerprint analysis
 Peter J. Weinberger – programming language design, the 'w' in AWK
 Mark Weiser – ubiquitous computing
 Joseph Weizenbaum – artificial intelligence, ELIZA
 David Wheeler – EDSAC, subroutines
 Franklin H. Westervelt – use of computers in engineering education, conversational use of computers, Michigan Terminal System (MTS), ARPANET, distance learning
 Steve Whittaker – human computer interaction, computer support for cooperative work, social media
 Jennifer Widom – nontraditional data management
 Gio Wiederhold – database management systems
 Norbert Wiener – Cybernetics
 Adriaan van Wijngaarden – Dutch pioneer; ARRA, ALGOL, IFIP WG 2.1 member
 Mary Allen Wilkes – LINC developer, assembler-linker designer
 Maurice Vincent Wilkes – microprogramming, EDSAC
 Yorick Wilks – computational linguistics, artificial intelligence
 James H. Wilkinson – numerical analysis
 Sophie Wilson – ARM architecture
 Shmuel Winograd – Coppersmith–Winograd algorithm
 Terry Winograd – artificial intelligence, SHRDLU
 Patrick Winston – artificial intelligence
 Niklaus Wirth – ALGOL W, IFIP WG 2.1 member, Pascal, Modula, Oberon
 Neil Wiseman – computer graphics
 Dennis E. Wisnosky – Integrated Computer-Aided Manufacturing (ICAM), IDEF
 Stephen Wolfram – Mathematica
 Mike Woodger – Pilot ACE, ALGOL 60, Ada (programming language)
 Philip Woodward – ambiguity function, sinc function, comb operator, rep operator, ALGOL 68-R
 Beatrice Helen Worsley – wrote the first PhD dissertation involving modern computers; was one of the people who wrote Transcode
 Steve Wozniak – engineered first generation personal computers at Apple Computer
 Jie Wu – computer networks
 William Wulf – BLISS system programming language + optimizing compiler, Hydra operating system, Tartan Laboratories

Y
 Mihalis Yannakakis 
 Andrew Chi-Chih Yao
 John Yen
 Nobuo Yoneda – Yoneda lemma, Yoneda product, ALGOL, IFIP WG 2.1 member
 Edward Yourdon – Structured Systems Analysis and Design Method
 Moti Yung

Z

 Lotfi Zadeh – fuzzy logic
 Hans Zantema – termination analysis
 Arif Zaman – pseudo-random number generator
 Stanley Zdonik — database management systems
 Hussein Zedan – formal methods and real-time systems
 Shlomo Zilberstein – artificial intelligence, anytime algorithms, automated planning, and decentralized POMDPs
 Jill Zimmerman – James M. Beall Professor of Mathematics and Computer Science at Goucher College
 Konrad Zuse – German pioneer of hardware and software

See also

 List of computing people
 List of important publications in computer science
 List of Jewish American computer scientists
 List of members of the National Academy of Sciences (computer and information sciences)
 List of pioneers in computer science
 List of programmers
 List of programming language researchers
 List of Russian IT developers
 List of Slovenian computer scientists
 List of Indian computer scientists

References

External links

CiteSeer list of the most cited authors in computer science
Computer scientists with h-index >= 40

 

Lists of people by occupation